The Stationmaster's Wife is a 1977 German television serial directed and edited by Rainer Werner Fassbinder. It was made for German television and originally aired in 1973 as a two-part miniseries. It was based on the 1931 novel Bolwieser: The Novel of a Husband by Oskar Maria Graf.  

The film is about an railroad system manager, Xaver Ferdinand Maria Bolwieser (the eponymous Station Master), who is unwittingly cuckolded by the town butcher and a hairdresser. Critic Vincent Canby, in his 1982  New York Times review, said the story, which is set in the fictional Bavarian town of Werburg in the 1920s, was reminiscent of Madame Bovary.

The 1983 theatrical release was 90 minutes shorter than the 201 minute TV version. The theatrical cut had been finalized and approved in 1977, but the release was postponed due to legal and commercial reasons.

Notes
In the credits, Fassbinder, who edited the film with Juliane Lorenz and Ila von Hasperg, was billed as a cutter under the stage name "Franz Walsch".

References

External links
 
 
  
 Bolwieser (TV) page at Rainer Werner Fassbinder Foundation
 Bolweiser a review by Roger Ebert

1977 films
1977 television films
Films directed by Rainer Werner Fassbinder
Films shot in Bavaria
German-language television shows
German television films
West German films
1970s German-language films
1970s German films
ZDF original programming